Mermet Lake State Fish and Wildlife Area is an Illinois state park on  and  of water Massac County, Illinois, United States. It is an old cypress swamp that sports abundant fowl and fish. It also has hiking trails and a large archery competition called the Pro/Am National Archery Tournament, which is among the largest in the country. The land was acquired by the Government of Illinois in 1949.

Its ecosystem contains panfish, channel catfish, largemouth bass, Canada geese, ducks, and snow geese.

References

State parks of Illinois
Protected areas of Massac County, Illinois
Protected areas established in 1949
1949 establishments in Illinois